Adolf Hitler made many hundreds of directives, orders and decrees while Führer of Nazi Germany, many of them related to military policy, and the treatment of civilians in occupied countries. Many of them are direct evidence of the commission of war crimes such as the notorious Commando Order. Other orders provide evidence of crimes against humanity, such as the Hitler order establishing forced euthanasia of disabled people in 1939 under Action T4, and the Nacht und Nebel order for eliminating civilian resisters in occupied countries.

Directive of 21 October 1938
On 21 October 1938, Hitler issued a new directive to the Wehrmacht to prepare for the "following eventualities":

 Securing the borders of the Reich and protection against surprise air attacks
 Liquidation of the remainder of the Czech state. It must be possible to smash at any time the remainder of the Czech state should it pursue an anti-German policy.
 The occupation of Memelland.

Action T4

In 1939 Hitler issued an order which became the justification for killing disabled children and adults in Action T4. It laid the basis for the Holocaust since gassing was a favoured method of murdering the many victims. The SS staff who operated the gas chambers were later employed at Auschwitz and many other concentration camps and death camps.

Fall Weiss directive
On 3 April 1939, the directive for Fall Weiss (Case White) was ready. It was issued on 11 April.

The first section, written by Hitler, began:

German relations with Poland continue to be based on the principles of avoiding any disturbances. Should Poland, however, change her policy towards Germany, a final settlement might become necessary in spite of the Treaty in force with Poland. The aim then will be to destroy Polish military strength, and create in the East a situation which satisfies the requirements of National Defence. The free state of Danzig will be proclaimed a part of Reich territory by the outbreak of hostilities at the latest. The political leaders consider it their task in this case to isolate Poland if possible, that is to say, to limit the war to Poland only.

The Wehrmacht had to be ready to carry out Fall Weiss at any time after 1 September 1939.

Commissar Order, June 1941

The notorious Commissar Order (Kommissarbefehl), dated 6 June 1941, followed directly on the Barbarossa decree. It was called Instructions on the Treatment of Political Commissars and began:
In the struggle against Bolshevism, we must not assume that the enemy's conduct will be based on principles of humanity or of international law. In particular, hate-inspired, cruel and inhumane treatment of prisoners can be expected on the part of all grades of political commissars, who are the real leaders of resistance...To show consideration to these elements during this struggle, or to act in accordance with international rules of war, is wrong and endangers both our own security and the rapid pacification of conquered territory...Political commissars have initiated barbaric, Asiatic methods of warfare. Consequently, they will be dealt with immediately and with maximum severity. As a matter of principle, they will be shot at once, whether captured during operations or otherwise showing resistance.

Nacht und Nebel, 7 December 1941

Nacht und Nebel ("Night and Fog") was a directive of Adolf Hitler on 7 December 1941 for the arrest and secret incarceration of all political activists, resistance supporters, and "anyone endangering German security" (die deutsche Sicherheit gefährden) throughout Nazi Germany's occupied territories. In February 1942, two months later, Armed Forces High Command Feldmarschall Wilhelm Keitel extended it to all persons in occupied countries who had been taken into custody and were still alive eight days later. 

The name referred to a magic spell involving the "Tarnhelm" ("stealth helmet") from Wagner's Rheingold, which could make its wearer invisible and instantly transport him far away. The decree was meant to intimidate local populations by denying friends and families of the missing any knowledge of their whereabouts or their fate. The prisoners were secretly transported to German concentration camps, apparently vanishing without a trace.

Führer Directive No. 46
Führer Directive No. 46 was issued on 18 August 1942 under the title "Instructions For Intensified Action Against Banditry [Bandenbekämpfung] In The East", marking the radicalisation of so-called anti-partisan warfare. The directive called on the security forces to act with "utter brutality" to achieve "complete extermination" of "gangs", while providing immunity from prosecution for any acts committed during "bandit-fighting" operations.

The directive designated the SS as the organisation responsible for rear-area warfare in areas under civilian administration. In areas under military jurisdiction (the Army Group Rear Areas), the Army High Command had the overall responsibility. The directive declared the entire population of "bandit" (i.e. partisan-controlled) territories as enemy combatants. In practice, this meant that the aims of security warfare was not pacification, but complete destruction and depopulation of "bandit" and "bandit-threatened" territories, turning them into "dead zones" (Tote Zonen).

Commando Order, October 1942

The Kommandobefehl ("Commando Order") was issued by Adolf Hitler on 18 October 1942 stating that all Allied commandos encountered by German forces in Europe and Africa should be killed immediately without trial, even in proper uniforms or if they attempted to surrender. Any commando or small group of commandos or a similar unit, agents, and saboteurs not in proper uniforms, who fell into the hands of the German military forces by some means other than direct combat (through the police in occupied territories, for instance) were to be handed over immediately to the Sicherheitsdienst (SD, Security Service). The order, which was issued in secret, made it clear that failure to carry out these orders by any commander or officer would be considered to be an act of negligence punishable under German military law.

Nero Decree

The Nero Decree was a scorched-earth order issued by Adolf Hitler on 19 March 1945, ordering the destruction of German infrastructure to prevent their use by Allied forces as they penetrated deep within Germany. 

It was officially titled Demolitions on Reich Territory Decree (Befehl betreffend Zerstörungsmaßnahmen im Reichsgebiet) and has subsequently become known as the Nero Decree, after the Roman Emperor Nero, who supposedly engineered the Great Fire of Rome in 64 AD. 

It was countermanded by among others, Albert Speer, Minister of Armaments and War Production, who wanted to preserve as much of the country's infrastructure as possible following the imminent defeat.

See also
 Severity Order
 Führer Directive No. 30
 Lex Krupp
 German war crimes

Citations

Bibliography

 
 Kershaw, Ian Hitler 1936-1945: Nemesis

External sources
 Adolf Hitler and World War II: Operational Orders
 Führer Directive No. 21: Operation Barbarossa

Orders by Adolf Hitler